Eristalis rupium, the Spot-winged Drone Fly, is a common European species, uncommon in North America. This species of syrphid fly was first officially described Fabricius in 1805. Hoverflies get their names from the ability to remain nearly motionless while in flight. The adults are also  known as flower flies for they are commonly found around and on flowers, from which they get both energy-giving nectar and protein-rich pollen. The larvae are aquatic filter-feeders of the rat-tailed type, found in streams with clear water.

References

Diptera of Europe
Eristalinae
Insects described in 1805